The purpose of this table is to provide reference information about the provenance and history of notable commercial open-source applications, adopting Business models for open-source software, alphabetized by the product/service name. It is not to be used or interpreted as an advertisement for the vendors.

References

Commercial open source applications